Sergei Sergeyevich Babkin (born 25 September 2002) is a Russian football player who plays as a central midfielder for PFC Krylia Sovetov Samara on loan from FC Lokomotiv Moscow.

Club career
He made his debut in the Russian Premier League for FC Lokomotiv Moscow on 24 July 2021 in a game against FC Arsenal Tula. He substituted Fyodor Smolov in the 90th minute.

On 7 September 2022, Babkin joined PFC Krylia Sovetov Samara on loan until the end of the season, with an option to buy.

Career statistics

References

External links
 
 
 

2002 births
Sportspeople from Volgograd
Living people
Russian footballers
Association football midfielders
FC Anzhi Makhachkala players
FC Lokomotiv Moscow players
PFC Krylia Sovetov Samara players
Russian Premier League players
Russian Second League players